Jongrak Pakdee is a professional footballer from Thailand. He is currently playing for Lampang in Thai League 2 as a  midfielder. He played three times in the Thai Premier League in 2016 for Nakhon Ratchasima.

References

External links
 
https://www.livesoccer888.com/players/Jongrak-Pakdee

1991 births
Living people
Jongrak Pakdee
Jongrak Pakdee
Association football midfielders
Jongrak Pakdee
Jongrak Pakdee
Jongrak Pakdee
Jongrak Pakdee